Jinjin & Rocky (Korean: 진진 & 라키) was the second official sub-unit of South Korean boy band Astro. The duo formed by Fantagio in 2022 is composed of two Astro members: Jinjin and Rocky. Their debut extended play, Restore, was released on January 17, 2022.

Career

Pre-debut 
On December 27, 2021, Fantagio released a surprise image teaser announcing that Jinjin and Rocky would form a duo and release their EP Restore the next month. It was revealed that the EP title means Recovery and the duo plan to deliver healing in their own way from the COVID-19 situation. Both Jinjin & Rocky are active as the main rappers and dancers of Astro.

2022: Debut with Restore 
On January 17, Jinjin & Rocky officially debuted with the EP Restore and its lead single, "Just Breath". The EP contains five songs of various genres—two songs sung by Jinjin & Rocky, two solo songs sung by Rocky and one song sung by Jinjin that features Weki Meki's Choi Yoo-jung. Jinjin and Rocky were actively involved in the production of all songs.

On February 28, 2023, Rocky did not renew his contract and thus left Fantagio and Astro, thereby ending the duo sub-unit.

Discography

Extended plays

Singles

Notes

References 

South Korean boy bands
K-pop music groups
Musical groups from Seoul
Musical groups established in 2022
2022 establishments in South Korea
South Korean dance music groups
Fantagio artists